Reno Hilligsø Kiilerich (born October 21, 1976) - is a heavy metal drummer from Denmark. Kiilerich has played with such bands as Panzerchrist, Evil Morgan, Kobeast, 12Gauge, Chthonic, Downlord, Exmortem, Hate Eternal, Strangler, Old Man's Child, Vile, Human Erupt, and Dimmu Borgir.

Awards 
 2003 Fastest feet in the world at NAMM

References

Danish heavy metal drummers
1976 births
Living people
Dimmu Borgir members
21st-century drummers
Old Man's Child members
Hate Eternal members